Monty (June 2017 – May 13, 2022) and Rose were a pair of piping plovers, who gained local fame in 2019 for being the first pair to successfully breed in Chicago in decades. They annually nested at Montrose Beach in the summer and nested separately in the winter, with Monty in Galveston, Texas, and Rose in Anclote Key, Florida. The pair, who had previously tried and failed to nest in a Waukegan parking lot, later moved to Montrose beach in Lincoln Park. The discovery generated much excitement in the local birding community, with a concert planned to be held on the beach cancelled and over 150 people volunteering to monitor the pair. The pair had two successful clutches, the first a clutch of four with three named Hazel, Esperanza and Nish successfully fledging, with the second, a clutch of four, losing two chicks while the survivors, named Imani and Siewka successfully fledged. Nish garnered its own fame when it and its partner, named Nellie, became the first piping plover pair to successfully nest in Ohio in 83 years, having their own successful clutch. Shortly after arriving back in Chicago on May 13, Monty was found stumbling and short of breath, and died that evening of yet unknown causes. The whereabouts and well-being of Rose are currently unknown, and she is likely yet to migrate back.

Influence 
In honour of the pair, November 18 was declared piping plover day in Illinois by state governor J.B. Pritzker.

A 2-part documentary about the pair, titled Monty and Rose and Monty and Rose 2: The World of Monty and Rose respectively, was produced and released by local filmmaker Bob Dolgan, originally for piping plover day.

References 

Individual seabirds
2017 animal births
2022 animal deaths
Individual animals in the United States